The  is a dam located in the city of Hirakawa, Aomori Prefecture in the Tohoku region of Japan.

The dam is a concrete gravity dam across the Hirakawa River, a tributary of the Iwaki River. Construction on the dam was begun in 1980 by a consortium led by the Obayashi Corporation, and the dams as completed in 1995. across the Kodomari River. It is a multipurpose dam to provide water for irrigation, flood control and drinking water.

External links

Official home page
Ministry of Land, Infrastructure, Transport and Tourism

Dams in Aomori Prefecture
Dams completed in 1995
Hirakawa, Aomori